Oscar Raul Paulín Delarrosa (born 31 July 1952 in Resistencia, Argentina) is an Argentine–Paraguayan former association footballer and current coach who directs Sportivo Ameliano in the Paraguayan Tercera Division.

Career

Player
Paulín played for Argentine clubs Chaco For Ever and Aldosivi, as well as Paraguay's Club Olimpia Asunción, Guaraní, Sportivo Luqueño, Ecuador's LDU Portoviejo and Bolivia's Oriente Petrolero. Paulin made four appearances for Olimpia Asunción during the 1977 Copa Libertadores.

Coach
In 2003, directs Tacuary where he coaches players like Cristian Riveros.

Paulín coached Guaraní from 2003 to 2004. During 2004, he coached the club in the Copa Libertadores and was replaced in February.

In 2011, coaches the first-team 3 de Febrero of Ciudad del Este, and in 2014 manages the Youth Academy of the mentioned club.

In 2015, takes Paraguayan Fourth Division club Sportivo Ameliano to Third Division for 2016 via promotion play-off. With two rounds remaining of the 2016, Paulín had placed Sportivo Ameliano at the top of the third division table and were ahead of the second placed team by one point.

References

External links
 
 

Living people
Argentine footballers
Club Olimpia footballers
Expatriate footballers in Venezuela
Expatriate footballers in Paraguay
1952 births
Association football defenders
People from Resistencia, Chaco
Sportspeople from Chaco Province
Argentine football managers
Club Libertad managers
Club Nacional managers
Club Tacuary managers
Club Guaraní managers
Club Olimpia managers
Sportivo Ameliano managers
12 de Octubre Football Club managers
Club Sol de América managers
Club Real Potosí managers
Sportivo Luqueño managers